Bermuda Commercial Bank Limited (“BCB”) is one of four licensed banks in Bermuda and is a 100% subsidiary of Provident Holdings Limited.  

BCB began by an Act of Parliament in February 1969.   BCB state-of-the-art core banking system provides a suite of products, including online banking. In June of 2016, the BCB Group of Companies moved into a new location at 34 Bermudiana Road, Hamilton. In 2019, BCB also celebrated its 50-year anniversary of providing banking services to Bermuda and internationally.

In July 2021, the investment company, Provident Holdings Limited, purchased the BCB Group of Companies from Somers Limited.  On March 1, 2022, BCB sold its licensed trust business and a primary licensed corporate administration services business together with two minor operational subsidiaries.  The sale was in line with a renewed strategy to focus on the core banking business in Bermuda.

References

Banks of Bermuda